Adolf van der Voort van Zijp (1 September 1892 in Klambir Lima, North Sumatra, Dutch East Indies – 8 March 1978 in Monaco) was a Dutch horse rider who competed in the 1924 Summer Olympics and in the 1928 Summer Olympics.

Biography
Born into a Dutch patrician family, he was first and foremost a military man, and like the other members of his Olympic team he served in the Dutch armed forces. At the Olympics of 1924 first Olympic games he was a lieutenant in the Second Regiment of the Huzares. Eventually he would be promoted to Inspector of the Cavalry.

In the 1924 Summer Olympics he won the gold medal in the individual three-day event as well as in the team three-day event.

Four years later he again won the gold medal in the team three-day event and placed fourth in the individual three-day event. His compatriot Charles Pahud de Mortanges was awarded the gold medal in the latter case.

In May 1940 Van der Voort van Zijp fought valiantly at the bloody battle of the Grebbeberg. After the German invasion of the Netherlands, he was imprisoned with other notables as a prisoner of war in Germany. Adolph van der Voort van Zijp died in Monaco on 8 March 1978.

References

External links
profile

1892 births
1978 deaths
Dutch male equestrians
Dutch dressage riders
Event riders
Equestrians at the 1924 Summer Olympics
Equestrians at the 1928 Summer Olympics
Olympic equestrians of the Netherlands
Olympic gold medalists for the Netherlands
Olympic medalists in equestrian
Royal Netherlands Army officers
Royal Netherlands Army personnel of World War II
Sportspeople from Medan
Medalists at the 1928 Summer Olympics
Medalists at the 1924 Summer Olympics
Dutch prisoners of war in World War II
World War II prisoners of war held by Germany
Sportspeople from North Sumatra
Dutch people of the Dutch East Indies